Pillune (possibly from Aymara pillu crown or cord which some indigenous peoples use to tighten their hair, -ni a suffix to indicate ownership, "the one with a crown" or "the one with a pillu") is a mountain in the Chila mountain range in the Andes of Peru, about  high. It is situated in the Arequipa Region, Castilla Province, Chachas District. Pillune lies southeast of a lake named Machucocha.

References

Mountains of Peru
Mountains of Arequipa Region